The 1947–48 Drexel Dragons men's basketball team represented Drexel Institute of Technology during the 1947–48 men's basketball season. The Dragons, led by 2nd year head coach Ralph Chase, played their home games at Curtis Hall Gym and were members of the Southern division of the Middle Atlantic States Collegiate Athletic Conference (MASCAC).

Roster

Schedule

|-
!colspan=9 style="background:#F8B800; color:#002663;"| Regular season
|-

References

Drexel Dragons men's basketball seasons
Drexel
1947 in sports in Pennsylvania
1948 in sports in Pennsylvania